

Mitaboni
Mitaboni is a town in Kenya's Machakos County in the lower eastern region of Kenya.

Towns in Machakos County

Nairobi Metro

Machakos County is within Greater Nairobi which consists of 4 out of 47 counties in Kenya but the area generates about 60% of the nations wealth. The counties are:
 Source: NairobiMetro/ Kenya Census

See also 
Tala
Machakos County

References 

Machakos County
Populated places in Eastern Province (Kenya)